The Roanoke Red Sox was a primary name of the minor league baseball teams based in Roanoke, Virginia. Between 1894 and 1953, Roanoke teams played as members of the Virginia League (1894–1896, 1906–1914, 1939–1942) and Piedmont League (1943–1953), winning five league championships and one pennant. Roanoke teams were a minor league affiliate of the Cleveland Indians in 1940 and Boston Red Sox from 1943 to 1953. Baseball Hall of Fame members Jack Chesbro (1896) and Heinie Manush (1943) played for Roanoke.

The Roanoke Red Sox preceded today's Class A level Salem Red Sox of the Carolina League.

History
Baseball began in Roanoke with the Roanoke Magicians (1894–1896), who were members of the Virginia League and had three consecutive losing seasons. The Virginia League folded after the 1896 season. Baseball Hall of Fame inductee Jack Chesbro was a pitcher for Roanoke in 1896 in his second professional season.

The Roanoke Tigers (1906–1914) played in the reformed Virginia League. The Tigers captured Virginia League Championships in 1909 and 1912.

In 1939, the Salem–Roanoke Friends (1939–1942) began play as members of the Virginia League. The team was named for Roanoke and neighboring Salem, Virginia. The Friends were affiliates of the Cleveland Indians (1940) and captured the 1941 Virginia League Championship. The Virginia League folded after the 1942 season.

After the Virginia League folded, the Roanoke Red Sox began play as members of the Piedmont League in 1943, with Baseball Hall of Fame inductee Heinie Manush as player/manager. The franchise would remain in the Piedmont League until 1953. Roanoke was a minor league affiliate of the Boston Red Sox and changed their moniker to the Roanoke Ro Sox in 1951. The Roanoke Red Sox won the Piedmont League Championships in 1947 and 1950. On July 24, 1953, the franchise folded with a 39–53 record.

The ballparks
The original minor league ballpark was noted to be Roanoke Ballpark (1894–1896, 1906), which seated about 1,000. The ballpark was located along Jefferson Street, near the corner of today's Reserve Avenue and Jefferson Street.

Salem Municipal Stadium (1939–1942) in neighboring Salem, Virginia reportedly played host to some games of the Salem–Roanoke Friends. Built in 1932, the ballpark hosted the Salem Rebels beginning in 1955. The ballpark is still in use today, known as Salem Kiwanis Field. The ballpark hosts Roanoke College teams. The address is 731 Indiana Street, Salem, Virginia.

From 1907–1914 and 1939–1953, Roanoke teams minor league teams were noted to have played minor league home games at Maher Field. The Roanoke Tigers moved to Maher Field in 1908, as new grandstands had been erected by the Roanoke Fair Association. Maher Field hosted other events at the site. In 1914, the Detroit Tigers with Ty Cobb played the Boston Braves in an exhibition game at the Maher Field. The ballpark had a capacity of 3,000 (1939) and 7,500 (1950), with dimensions of (Left, Center, Right) 280–380–278 (1939). Today, grandstand is gone, but the playing field is still in use. Maher Field is located at 230 Reserve Avenue SW, Roanoke, Virginia.

Notable alumni

Baseball Hall of Fame alumni
 Jack Chesbro (1896) Inducted, 1947
 Heinie Manush (1943, MGR) Inducted, 1964

Notable alumni
Ken Aspromonte (1952)
Milt Bolling (1948-1949)
 Steve Brodie (1907)
Hal Brown (1946-1947) Baltimore Orioles Hall of Fame
Don Buddin (1952)
Jerry Casale (1953)
 Pete Daley (1949)
Ike Delock (1950)
Arnold Earley (1953)
 John Farrell (1895)
 Dave Fultz (1895)
 Fred Hatfield (1946)
Pinky Higgins (1947–1948, MGR) 3X MLB All-Star
Russ Kemmerer (1951)
Ted Lepcio (1951)
Charlie Maxwell (1947–1949) 2x MLB All-Star
 Dick Padden (1895)
Eddie Popowski (1944–1945, MGR)
 Togie Pittinger (1896)
 Hank Schenz (1939)
Walter Schmidt (1911)
Frank Shaughnessy (1909–1911) Canadian Baseball Hall of Fame
 Chick Stahl (1895)
Virgil Stallcup (1946)
Sammy White (1950) MLB All-Star

See also
Roanoke Magicians players
Roanoke Ro-Sox players
Roanoke Red Sox players
Roanoke Tigers players
Salem-Roanoke Friends players

References

External links
Baseball Reference

Defunct minor league baseball teams
Sports in Roanoke, Virginia
Sports teams in Virginia
Baseball teams in Virginia
Baseball in Salem, Virginia
Boston Red Sox minor league affiliates
Cleveland Guardians minor league affiliates
Defunct baseball teams in Virginia
Baseball teams disestablished in 1953
Baseball teams established in 1943
Piedmont League teams